Mortimer's Cross Water Mill is an 18th-century watermill located on the River Lugg,  northwest of Leominster, Herefordshire, England. It is owned by Historic England and is in partial working order.

References

External links
 Mortimers Cross Mill website
 Historic England - Water mill and quarry at Mortimer's Cross
 Historic England - Mortimer's Cross Mill

English Heritage sites in Herefordshire
Watermills in Herefordshire
Museums in Herefordshire
Mill museums in England